The 1999 Wan Chai District Council election was held on 28 November 1999 to elect all 11 elected members to the 14-member District Council.

Overall election results
Before election:

Change in composition:

Results by constituency

Broadwood

Canal Road

Causeway Bay

Happy Valley

Hennessy

Jardine's Lookout

Oi Kwan

Southorn

Stubbs Road

Tai Fat Hau

Tai Hang

See also
 1999 Hong Kong local elections

References

1999 Hong Kong local elections
Wan Chai District Council elections